Juan Gualberto Fernández Rivera (born 12 July 1941) is a retired footballer from El Salvador.

He represented his country at the 1970 FIFA World Cup in Mexico.

Club career
Fernández played in the Salvadoran league for Atlante.

International career
Nicknamed El Pulpo (the Octopus), Fernández played in the El Salvador in the sixties and seventies. In 1968, he participated in the Olympics in Mexico, where he appeared in the losses against Israel and Hungary as well as the draw against Ghana.

In 1968 and 1969, Fernández also helped the national team qualify for the 1970 World Cup in Mexico when he represented his country in 7 FIFA World Cup qualification matches. At the World Cup, he was a reserve and did not play in any match.

Coaching career
Fernández also served as an assistant and goalkeeping coach for Independiente, Cojutepeque and Alianza.

References

External links

1941 births
Living people
Association football goalkeepers
Salvadoran footballers
El Salvador international footballers
Footballers at the 1968 Summer Olympics
Olympic footballers of El Salvador
1970 FIFA World Cup players
Alianza F.C. footballers